Iranian Aluminium Company (IRALCO) is an Iranian aluminum manufacturer located in Arak. It is the largest producer of aluminum in Iran. About 11,000 fabrication plants and workshops with more than 250,000 personnel are working in industries affiliated to aluminum. The products of the firm are produced according to the international standards and the minimum purity of aluminum is 99.70%.

IRALCO is a member of the London Metal Exchange and listed on the Tehran Stock Exchange.

See also
Mining in Iran

References

External links
 Iranian Aluminium Company Home Page

Aluminium companies of Iran
1972 establishments in Iran
Companies listed on the Tehran Stock Exchange
Iranian brands
Companies based in Arak
Iranian entities subject to the U.S. Department of the Treasury sanctions